The Women's individual pursuit at the 2013 UCI Track Cycling World Championships was held on February 20. 15 athletes participated in the contest. After the qualification, the fastest 2 riders advanced to the Final and the 3rd and 4th fastest riders raced for the bronze medal.

Medalists

Results

Qualifying
The qualifying was held at 14:40.

Finals
The finals were held at 20:30.

Small Final

Final

References

2013 UCI Track Cycling World Championships
UCI Track Cycling World Championships – Women's individual pursuit
UCI